Dorothea Angermann is a 1959 West German drama film directed by Robert Siodmak and starring Ruth Leuwerik, Bert Sotlar and Alfred Schieske. It was adapted from the play by Gerhart Hauptmann.

The film's sets were designed by the art director Robert Stratil.

Plot
Dorothea Angermann, the daughter of a clergyman, is accused of the murder of her husband, a brutal man that she was obliged to marry because she was pregnant and he was the father of the baby.

Cast
 Ruth Leuwerik as Dorothea Angermann
 Bert Sotlar as Michael Sever
 Alfred Schieske as Pastor Angermann
 Kurt Meisel as Mario Malloneck
 Edith Schultze-Westrum as Frau Lüders
 Alfred Balthoff as Weiss
 Monika John as Rosa
 Ursula Herwig as Irene
 Ernst Konstantin as Gerichtsvorsitzender
 Holger Hagen as Defense lawyer
 Heliane Bei as Wally
 Claudia Gerstäcker as Irmgard
 Wilmut Borell as Prosecutor
 Walter Sedlmayr as Willi
 Karl Lieffen

References

Bibliography 
 Alpi, Deborah Lazaroff. Robert Siodmak: A Biography. McFarland, 1998.

External links 

1959 films
West German films
German drama films
1959 drama films
1950s German-language films
Films directed by Robert Siodmak
German films based on plays
Films based on works by Gerhart Hauptmann
Gloria Film films
1950s German films